| tries = {{#expr:
 + 7 + 6 + 1 + 4 + 8
 + 6 + 6 + 8 + 5 + 8
 + 11 + 7 + 4 + 7 + 7
 + 5 + 4 + 8 + 6 + 14
 + 7 + 4 + 4 + 9 + 6
 + 8 + 13 + 7 + 11 + 7
 + 10 + 4 + 11 + 9 + 7
 + 6 + 6 + 12 + 8 + 7
 + 9 + 7 + 7 + 12 + 13
 + 10 + 8 + 11 + 6 + 6
 + 9 + 9 + 9 + 8
 + 8 + 10
}}
| top point scorer   =  Owen Farrell(Saracens)102 points
| top try scorer     =  Rayn Smid(Ealing Trailfinders)9 tries
| prevseason         = 2019–20
| nextseason         = 2021–22
}}

The 2020–21 RFU Championship, also known as the 2020–21 Greene King IPA Championship for sponsorship reasons, was the twelfth season of the RFU Championship, the professional second tier of rugby union in England. It featured ten English teams and one from Jersey. The competition was sponsored by Greene King for the eighth successive season. Due to the COVID-19 pandemic in the United Kingdom, this season featured a truncated timeframe of just 16 weeks with a later start and fewer rounds.

Structure 
In a change from previous years, the eleven teams played each of the other teams once only, either home or away, to produce a ten-round season. The top two teams played each other in a two-legged play-off, with the winner promoted to the Premiership, if eligible. Due to the cancellation of the National League 1, there was no relegation. The season began on 6 March 2021, and the final round of matches were played in May 2021. Each team received one bye week, and there were three reserve weekends during the season.

RFU funding change 
Each club received approximately £375,000 in funding from the RFU in a phased return to the level of funding provided prior to 2016–17 season. Following news of the funding change, several clubs announced their intention to switch to a semi-professional business model.

Teams 
Nine of the eleven teams played in last season's competition. Yorkshire Carnegie, later renamed Leeds Tykes, were relegated to National League 1 after finishing bottom of the 2019–20 RFU Championship. They were replaced by Richmond who were promoted from 2019–20 National League 1 after just one year away from the Championship. Newcastle Falcons were promoted back to Premiership Rugby at the first attempt. They were replaced in the RFU Championship by Saracens, who were relegated after finishing bottom of the 2019–20 Premiership Rugby table.

On 2 February 2021, Ampthill announced that due to funding cuts and the costs associated with the COVID-19 pandemic, they might not be able to take part in the season. However, after a large donation, they were able to participate.

London Scottish did not participate due to the costs associated with the pandemic.

Pre-season competition 
Ahead of the season, Ealing, Doncaster and Saracens participated in the Trailfinders Challenge Cup, as a pre-season warm-up. It took place between the 16 January and 20 February as a round-robin tournament where teams played each other home and away.

Ealing Trailfinders won the competition with one game remaining, they received a trophy and £20,000.

Table

Fixtures

Table

Fixtures & Results 
Fixtures for the season were announced by the RFU on 8 February 2021. Jersey Reds played only 3 games at home, having switched with their opponents for their rounds 3 and 5 games based on travel concerns.

Round 1

Round 2

Round 3

Round 4

Round 5

Round 6

Round 7

Round 8

Round 9

Round 10

Round 11

Final 
The top two teams took part in a two-legged final to determine the champion. The top ranked team at the end of the league season chose which leg they play at home. The matches were played on 13 and 20 June 2021. Subject to meeting the minimum criteria, the champion would be promoted to Premiership Rugby. On 22 May, both Ealing Trailfinders and Saracens qualified for the final. The final was confirmed on 3 June, with Ealing Trailfinders playing the first leg at home.

In June 2021, it was confirmed that only Saracens were eligible for promotion, as Ealing Trailfinders did not meet an RFU deadline, despite having a groundshare in place. Trailfinders intended to appeal the decision, as they claim they were not given adequate information from the league.

With an aggregate score of 117–15, Saracens won the final to take their first second-tier title since 1995 and earn promotion to the Premiership.

First Leg

Second Leg

Leading scorers 
Note: Flags to the left of player names indicate national team as has been defined under World Rugby eligibility rules, or primary nationality for players who have not yet earned international senior caps. Players may hold one or more non-WR nationalities.

Most points 

Source:

Most tries 

Source:

Notes

References 

 
RFU Championship seasons
RFU Championship